Hedworth Williamson may refer to:

Sir Hedworth Williamson, 7th Baronet (1797–1861), British politician 
Sir Hedworth Williamson, 8th Baronet (1827–1900), British Liberal Party politician

See also 
Williamson baronets